Emmaloba is a settlement in Kenya's Vihiga County.

References 

Populated places in Western Province (Kenya)
Vihiga County